Port Adelaide Football Club is a professional Australian rules football club based in Alberton, South Australia. The club's senior men's team plays in the Australian Football League (AFL), where they are nicknamed the Power, whilst its reserves men's team competes in the South Australian National Football League (SANFL), where they are nicknamed the Magpies. Since its founding, the club has won an unequalled 36 SANFL premierships and 4 Championship of Australia titles, in addition to an AFL Premiership in 2004. It has also fielded a women's team in the AFL Women's (AFLW) league since 2022.

Founded in 1870, Port Adelaide is the oldest professional football club in South Australia and the fifth-oldest club in the AFL. Port Adelaide was a founding member of the South Australian Football Association (SAFA), later renamed as the SANFL. Port Adelaide has repeatedly asserted itself as a dominant force within South Australian football, going undefeated in all competitions in 1914, and enjoying sustained periods of success under coaches Fos Williams and John Cahill, sharing a combined 19 premierships between them. After entering the AFL in 1997, the club claimed three minor premierships and a premiership under coach Mark Williams between 2002 and 2004. Port Adelaide holds a unique status among AFL clubs, being the only pre-existing non-Victorian club to have entered the AFL from another league.

Port Adelaide has a long-standing rivalry with fellow SANFL club Norwood, as well as an intense rivalry with the Adelaide Crows in the AFL; it is a fixture referred to as the 'Showdown'. The club has played at their SANFL home ground, Alberton Oval, since 1880 and has used their AFL home ground, Adelaide Oval, since 2014. Port Adelaide first adopted the colours black and white in 1902, with their 'Prison Bar' guernsey. Following its entry to the AFL, the club adopted the colours of teal and silver, in order to differentiate it from Collingwood.

Club history

1870–1901: Early years 

Port Adelaide was formed on 12 May 1870 as a joint football and cricket club, created by locals to benefit the growing number of workers associated with the surrounding wharves and industries of Port Adelaide. The first training session of the newly formed club took place two days later. The Port Adelaide Football Club played its first match against a newly established club from North Adelaide called the Young Australian. Prior to 1877, football in South Australia was yet to be formally organised by a single body and as a result there were two main sets of rules in use across the state. In an effort to create a common set of rules, Port Adelaide was invited to join seven other clubs in the formation of the South Australian Football Association (SAFA), the first ever governing body of Australian rules football.

In 1879, the club played reigning Victorian Football Association (VFA) premiers Geelong at Adelaide Oval in what was Port Adelaide's first game against an interstate club. It played its first match outside of South Australia two years later, when it travelled to Victoria to contest a game against the Sale Football Club.

The club won its first premiership in 1884, when it ended Norwood's run of six consecutive premierships. It later contested the SAFA's first grand final in 1889, as Port Adelaide and Norwood had finished the season with equal minor round records. Norwood went on to defeat Port Adelaide by two goals. Port Adelaide won its second SAFA premiership the following year, and went on to be crowned "Champions of Australia" for the first time after defeating VFA premiers South Melbourne.

As the 1890s continued, Australia was affected by a severe depression that forced many players to move interstate to find work. This exodus translated into poor on-field results for the club. By 1896, the club was in crisis and finished last, causing the club's committee to meet with the aim of revitalising the club. The revitalisation had immediate results, helping Port Adelaide win a third premiership in 1897, one of only four occurrences since 1877 where a team won a premiership after finishing last the previous year. Stan Malin won Port Adelaide's first Magarey Medal in 1899.

During the 19th century, the club had nicknames including the Cockledivers, the Seaside Men, the Seasiders and the Magentas. In 1900, Port finished bottom in the six-team competition, which it has not done in any senior league since.

1902–1915: 'Prison Bars' and the 'Invincibles' 

Port Adelaide began wearing black and white guernseys in 1902 after it was having trouble finding dyes that would last for its blue and magenta guernseys. After finishing the 1902 season on top of the ladder, Port Adelaide was disqualified from their finals game against  after the club disputed the use of an unaccredited umpire. The 1902 SAFA premiership was subsequently awarded to North Adelaide after they defeated South Adelaide in the Grand Final a week later. Port Adelaide offered to play North Adelaide after the conclusion of the season, but the SAFA refused to allow it. Port Adelaide won the premiership the following year.

In the early 1910s, Port Adelaide became a consistent premiership contender, setting up the club to win three more Championships of Australia. Port Adelaide won the South Australian Football League (SAFL) premiership in 1910 defeating Sturt 8.12 (60) to 5.11 (41) in the Grand Final. The club would go on to defeat Collingwood for the 1910 Championship of Australia title, and Western Australian Football League (WAFL) premiers East Fremantle in an exhibition match. They also defeated a combination of some of the WAFL's best players in another match. Although Port Adelaide had success in the minor rounds the following two seasons, dropping only one game in 1911 and going undefeated in 1912, it was knocked out of contention by West Adelaide both times. The club won the SAFL premiership in 1913, dropping only two games during the minor round and defeating North Adelaide in the Grand Final. They also defeated Fitzroy for the 1913 Championship of Australia.

The 1914 Port Adelaide Football Club season is unique in SANFL history, being the only occasion in which a team has gone undefeated. The club won all its pre-season matches, won all fourteen SAFL games and the 1914 SAFL Grand Final where it held North Adelaide to a single goal for the match 13.15 (93) to 1.8 (14). It also became the first to score over 1000 points during the minor round. The club met Victorian Football League (VFL) premiers Carlton in the Championship of Australia, defeating them by 34 points to claim a record fourth title. At the end of the 1914 season, a combined team from the six other SAFL clubs played Port Adelaide and lost to the subsequently-dubbed "Invincibles" by 58 points.

1916–1949: Two World Wars and the Great Depression 

Port Adelaide's early-century success was hindered by World War I. During the war, the club lost three players as casualties. A scaled-back competition referred to as the 'Patriotic League' was organised during wartime in which Port Adelaide won the 1916 and 1917 instalments. Port Adelaide initially struggled to replicate its past success after the war. After eventually winning the 1921 premiership under the captaincy of Harold Oliver, many of Port Adelaide's champion players from before the war started to retire, and the club's performance declined. It won only a single premiership between 1922 and 1935.

By the mid-1930s, Port Adelaide's form began to recover. It suffered two narrow grand final losses in 1934 and 1935, before winning consecutive premierships the following two years. During 1939, Bob Quinn, in his third year as a player for the club, coached the team to a Grand Final win over West Torrens. Many Port Adelaide players also enlisted for military service during this time. The club suffered six player casualties during the war.

Just as had happened in 1914, the league was hit hard by player losses in World War II. Due to a lack of able men, the league's eight teams were reduced to four and Port Adelaide temporarily merged with nearby West Torrens from 1942 to 1944. The joint club played in all three Grand Finals during this period, winning the 1942 instalment, but losing the 1943 and 1944 editions to the Norwood-North Adelaide combination. While normal competition resumed in 1945, Port Adelaide was unable to regain its pre-war success in the rest of the decade. In particular, it lost the 1945 SANFL Grand Final after a remarkable comeback from West Torrens. The 'All Australian', predecessor to the modern 'All-Australian' team, was created by Sporting Life magazine in 1947, with Bob Quinn being named in the side as captain.

1950–1973: Fos Williams era and Jack Oatey rivalry 

During the 1950s, Port Adelaide reestablished itself as a perennial contender, winning seven premierships. At the end of the 1949, having missed two finals series in a row, the Port Adelaide Football Club's committee sought out a coach that could win the club its next premiership. Following a failed attempt to obtain Jim Deane, the decision was made to appoint Fos Williams, a rover from West Adelaide. In his second season as player-coach in 1951, Williams led the club to their first standalone premiership in 12 seasons, defeating North Adelaide by 11 points. In the 1951 post-season, Port Adelaide lost an exhibition match to reigning VFL premiers .

In the mid-1950s, Port Adelaide and Melbourne, often the premiers of South Australian and Victorian leagues respectively, played exhibition matches at Norwood Oval. The most notable game was the 1955 match, which had an estimated crowd of 23,000. The match went down to the last 15 seconds when Frank Adams kicked a decisive behind to give Melbourne a one-point victory.

Geof Motley took over the captain-coaching role at the club in 1959 when Williams retired from his playing career and also took a break from coaching. That year, the club won the premiership and equalled a national record of six consecutive Grand Final victories, having won each premiership from 1954 to 1959. Port Adelaide's premiership streak was brought to an end in the 1960 preliminary final with a 27-point loss to Norwood.

Williams returned in 1962, and coached Port Adelaide to win three of the next four premierships. In 1965 he coached his ninth and last premiership in front of 62,543 people, the largest-ever crowd at Adelaide Oval. After the 1965 Grand Final, Port Adelaide's success was limited by the dominance of Sturt, which won seven premierships over this period under the leadership of Jack Oatey. Despite playing in 6 of the next 10 grand finals, Port Adelaide failed to win another premiership in that span.

1974–1996: John Cahill, SANFL domination and AFL licence 

One of Port Adelaide's leading players during the Fos Williams era was John Cahill. After retiring from playing in 1973 and following the departure of Fos Williams to West Adelaide in 1974, he took over as coach and began another era of premiership success for the club. In 1976, Cahill took Port Adelaide to its first Grand Final under his leadership, facing Sturt. Sturt won in front of an official attendance of 66,897, the record for football in South Australia. The actual crowd was estimated at 80,000, much bigger than the official figure. The following year, Port Adelaide won the premiership to break a 12-year drought.

The 1980 season was Port Adelaide's most dominant since 1914. The club completed its fourth ever 'Triple Crown', winning the premiership, Magarey Medal and having the SANFL's leading goalkicker in a single season. The Magarey Medal was awarded to Russell Ebert for a record 4th time and Tim Evans set the then-league goal kicking record of 146 goals in a season. The club set a new record for most points scored during a season at 3,176, whilst also having conceding only 1,687 points.

In his stead, Russell Ebert became coach in 1983. During his five years as coach, Port Adelaide made the finals three times, and achieved a win rate of above 55%. John Cahill returned as coach from the 1988 season, winning the premiership that year. He won a further five premierships, totalling a record-equalling ten over his coaching career.

Two key events of the late 1980s were attempts by the VFL to further expand outside of Victoria and financial difficulties in the SANFL. In 1989, seven of the ten SANFL clubs were recording losses and the combined income of the SANFL and WAFL had dropped to 40% of that of the VFL. During May 1990, the SANFL clubs unanimously accepted a SANFL proposal to not enter a club from South Australia until 1993. Weeks later, Port Adelaide, suffering from a mixture of ambition and frustration, started secret negotiations with the VFL in the town of Quorn for entry to the competition in 1991. When knowledge of Port Adelaide's negotiations to gain an AFL licence were made public, the other nine SANFL clubs called a crisis meeting to discuss options. Plans were made to kick Port Adelaide out of the SANFL should they succeed, and to prevent them from using Football Park as a home ground. SANFL clubs urged Justice Olssen to make an injunction against the bid, which he agreed to. During these meetings, an option was discussed to make a counter offer to the AFL. On the 16th of August, the SANFL officially launched a submission for a composite team. After legal action from all parties, the AFL agreed to accept the SANFL's bid to enter the composite team, which was named the Adelaide Football Club.

During December 1994, Max Basher announced that Port Adelaide had won the tender for the second South Australian AFL licence on the condition that a merger take place between two existing AFL clubs to keep the league at the club limit imposed by the AFL in 1993. As such, the licence would not be made available until at least 1996, and was not guaranteed. With the merger of the Brisbane Bears and  looming, the club was advised on 21 May 1996 by the AFL that they would take part in the 1997 AFL season.

1997–2010: AFL entry, Mark Williams and club debt 

Following confirmation of their entry in 1997, the club began preparations to enter the league. John Cahill began the transition to the AFL, with Stephen Williams, a son of Fos Williams, taking over the SANFL coaching position from midway through the 1996 season. Cahill then set about forming a group which would form the inaugural squad. Brownlow Medallist and 1990 Port Adelaide premiership player, Gavin Wanganeen, was signed from Essendon and made captain of a team made up of six existing Port Adelaide players, two from the Adelaide Crows, seven players from other SANFL clubs and 14 recruits from interstate. The AFL's father-son rule for the club was set at 200 games for SANFL players before 1997, compared to only 100 for Victorian clubs.
On 29 March 1997, Port Adelaide played its first AFL premiership match against Collingwood at the MCG, suffering a 79-point defeat. It won its first AFL game in round 3 against Geelong, and defeated cross town rivals and eventual premiers Adelaide by 11 points in the first Showdown in round 4. The club finished its first season 9th, missing the finals on percentage behind Brisbane. Following the 1998 season, John Cahill retired from his coaching position.

In 1999 Mark Williams, another son of Fos Williams, took over as coach of Port Adelaide and led the club to many notable first achievements in the AFL over the next decade. They earned a spot in the AFL finals for the first time in Williams's first season. They were eliminated by eventual premier, North Melbourne, by 44 points in their qualifying final. Port Adelaide had a very successful 2001 season, starting with a maiden pre-season competition victory. Port Adelaide finished their 2001 home and away season in third place, though the club would lose both finals it contested. In 2002, Port Adelaide built on its success and won its first AFL minor premiership. However, they lost to the eventual premiers, the Brisbane Lions in the preliminary final. Port Adelaide continued its minor round dominance in 2003 and again claimed the minor premiership; however like the previous year, Port Adelaide was eliminated in the preliminary final.

The 2004 season started strongly for Port Adelaide, winning five of their first six matches. Although they lost three of their next five games, the club would only lose a single game between Round 12 and the end of the minor round. This resulted in the club claiming the minor premiership for third consecutive year. Port Adelaide won its qualifying final against Geelong, earning a home preliminary final. Port Adelaide made it through to its first AFL grand final after defeating St Kilda in a preliminary final by six points, with Gavin Wanganeen kicking the winning goal. The following week Port Adelaide faced the Brisbane Lions, who were attempting to win a record-equalling fourth straight AFL premiership. Port Adelaide led by 15 points at quarter time, but a strong second quarter by Brisbane meant only one point separated the sides at half time. Late in the third quarter Port Adelaide took the ascendency to lead by 17 points at three-quarter time, and dominated the final term to win by 40 points: 17.11 (113) to 10.13 (73). Byron Pickett was awarded with the Norm Smith Medal for being judged the best player in the match, tallying 20 disposals and kicking three goals.

Port Adelaide had limited success in the middle of the decade. In 2005, the club made the finals for the fifth consecutive season, where they contested the only Showdown final to date, with rivals Adelaide winning by 83 points. In 2007, Port Adelaide finished the minor round second on the ladder with 15–7 record. They reached that year's grand final, where they were defeated by Geelong by an AFL record margin of 119 points, 24.19 (163) to 6.8 (44).

Following their second grand final, Port Adelaide began experiencing financial troubles and also saw a decline in performance. By 2009, the club had accumulated a consolidated debt totalling $5.1 million and was unable to pay its players; they had lost $1.6 million the season before. The AFL delayed giving the club financial support, instead urging it to sort out deals with SANFL as a predecessor to any league support. On 20 May, Port were handed $2.5 million in debt relief by the SANFL, and on 15 June were handed a $1 million grant by the AFL commission. Plans for a re-merging of the two teams was rejected by the SANFL early during 2010, though they eventually signed off on the proposal during November 2010.

The 2010 season saw Mark Williams step down as senior coach. Matthew Primus took over as caretaker coach for Port Adelaide after Mark Williams stood down. He led the club to five wins from its final seven games.

2011–present: Matthew Primus, Ken Hinkley and independence 

On 9 September 2010, Matthew Primus was appointed as the senior coach of the club for the next three years. The SANFL sought to take control of Port Adelaide in 2011. Despite underwriting $5 million of Port's debt in 2010, the takeover failed when the SANFL was unable to get a line of credit to cover Port Adelaide's future debts. After the failure of the takeover, AFL Chief executive Andrew Demetriou offered $9 million over the next three years to help the club, ahead of the move to the Adelaide Oval. Port Adelaide suffered its worst season result in 141 years, finishing sixteenth with 3 wins for the season.

On 8 October 2012, Ken Hinkley was announced as the new senior coach of the club. During the same week, David Koch was named chairman of the club and numerous board members were replaced. The club finished the home and away season 7th on the ladder, qualifying for finals for the first time since 2007. Port travelled to Melbourne to play Collingwood at the MCG in an Elimination Final where they won by 24 points; they then lost to Geelong by 16 points the following week in a Semi-final.

The 2014 season saw both Port Adelaide and Adelaide move their home ground from Football Park to the redeveloped Adelaide Oval. Port Adelaide signed up a record 48,968 members for the 2014 season, an increase of 23% from the previous year, and averaged 44,824 at home games. Port Adelaide finished fifth on the ladder, with a win–loss record of 14–8. They hosted Richmond in the elimination finals, kicking the first seven goals of the game and leading by as much as 87 points before recording a 57-point victory. After defeating  in the semi-finals, the club's season ended with a three-point loss to Hawthorn in the preliminary finals.

In 2017, Port Adelaide made finals after winning 14 games to finish fifth on the ladder. In the 2020 AFL season, Port Adelaide qualified for the finals as minor premiers for the first time since 2004, making it to the preliminary final and being defeated by eventual premiers  by 6 points. Port Adelaide returned to the AFL finals in the 2021 season, finishing in second place at the end of the home-and-away season and qualifying for a second consecutive preliminary final, where they were defeated by the Western Bulldogs by 71 points. Despite this, Ollie Wines became the first Port Adelaide player to win the Brownlow Medal, the league's highest individual honour, winning the award with a record-equalling tally of votes.

AFLW involvement 

Port Adelaide first showed interest in an AFL Women's side in 2015. The club signed Erin Phillips as their marquee player in the event that the club was admitted to the AFLW for the 2017 season. However, logistical demands related to the club's China program prevented the club from submitting a bid. The club subsequently attempted to enter a side in the SANFL Women's League (SANFLW), but this approach was rejected by the South Australian Football Commission. In May 2021, the AFL Commission announced that the remaining four clubs without AFLW teams would be admitted to the competition by the end of 2023, with the clubs to bid for entry order. Port Adelaide's bid to enter the competition was successful, with the AFL Commission deciding all four clubs would debut in the AFLW in the 2022/23 season.

SANFL presence (Post–AFL entry) 
As part of Port Adelaide's initial bid for the 1994 AFL license, the club had no plans to maintain a presence in the SANFL. After winning the tender for the license, however, an agreement was created with the SANFL for Port Adelaide to field two separate clubs in the SANFL and AFL, at the request of the other SANFL clubs. This agreement resulted in the creation of the Port Adelaide Magpies Football Club, a separate legal entity to Port Adelaide Football Club. For the first few years after 1997, the Port Adelaide Magpies were forced to train at Ethelton to ensure they would not gain any advantage using the upgraded Alberton training facilities. Additionally, Port Adelaide AFL-listed players who were not selected for the senior team were randomly drafted to SANFL clubs to play reserves matches until the two Port Adelaide entities merged. This arrangement was necessitated as the other SANFL clubs did not want the reserves side to gain any use of the senior side in the AFL's resources, fearing any potential advantages would be too strong in the SANFL. Australian football historian John Devaney described the forced separation of Port Adelaide's SANFL and AFL operations as being "akin to the enforced splitting up of families associated with military conquest or warfare".

In response to financial trouble suffered by both Port Adelaide entities, the "One Port Adelaide Football Club" movement was launched by former players Tim Ginever and George Fiacchi on 20 August 2010, in an effort to merge Port Adelaide's AFL and SANFL operations. A website was created that claimed 50,000 signatures were needed for the merger. On 16 November 2010, following approval from all nine SANFL clubs, the club formalised the off-field merger between the two entities. On 10 September 2013, Port Adelaide and the SANFL agreed to a model to allow all its AFL-listed players (not selected to play for Port Adelaide in the AFL) to play for the SANFL side. As part of the arrangement, the club lost its recruiting zones and could no longer field sides in the junior SANFL competitions, and as a result established an 18 to 22 year old academy training team to compete in the league's reserves competition. In 2018, Port Adelaide and the league jointly agreed that it would no longer field a team in the SANFL Reserves competition.

Port Adelaide initially still had success in the SANFL after accession into the AFL, with the Port Adelaide Magpies winning back to back Grand Finals in 1998 and 1999. However, the club would not make another grand final until the 2014 season, where it was defeated by Norwood by four points. Port Adelaide featured in two further grand finals against Sturt and Glenelg, though it would be defeated in both.

The club did not field a team in the SANFL in the 2020 season due to AFL restrictions imposed during the COVID-19 pandemic, though it re-joined the competition in 2021.

Club symbols and identity

Club guernseys

Captain and No. 1 guernsey 
The tradition dictating that the captain of the Port Adelaide Football Club wear the number one guernsey started when Clifford Keal wore the number as club captain for the first time in 1924. The tradition was cemented, at least in the view of then-secretary Charles Hayter, when in 1929 he received a letter from a junior Kilkenny player requesting a number one Port Adelaide guernsey as he had just become captain of his underage team. Hayter granted the wish of the junior and provided him with a number one Port Adelaide guernsey. Since 1924, there have been few exceptions to the tradition. The most notable exception was Geof Motley, who followed the captaincy of Fos Williams. Following his appointment as captain-coach, Motley elected to continue wearing the number 17, and continued to do so for the remainder of his career. When Motley handed the captaincy to John Cahill in 1967, at the insistence of coach Fos Williams, the tradition of Port Adelaide captains wearing the number one guernsey resumed. When co-captains were appointed for the 2019 season the No. 1 guernsey was temporarily retired. It was re-instated the following season when the club returned to appointing a single captain.

Number panel 

The white number panel on the back of the Port Adelaide guernsey originates from the first decade of the twentieth century when club secretary James Hodge took the club across Australia to play matches against interstate teams. During the early 1900s, it was commonplace that touring teams would wear numbers, allowing spectators to identify unknown footballers. Port Adelaide attached a white square to the back of its guernsey, with black numbers to be printed on the square. This design would continue to be used after the introduction of numbers into the SANFL, and was interchangeably with a black square and white numbers. The design bearing the black square eventually became the design of choice until 1928. The club introduced a 'permanent' white panel for the 1928 season, which would remain until the club was forced to merge with West Torrens during WWII. The club reintroduced the panel in 1953 and has since continuously used it in the SANFL. The panel was also present on the club's AFL guernsey until it was phased out in 2009. The number panel returned to the club's guernsey in 2017. The white panel is also intended to resemble the white back of a local Magpie species that is present on the badge of South Australia.

'Prison Bar' guernsey 

Historically, the black and white 'Prison Bar' guernsey, alternatively and historically known as the Wharf Pylon guernsey, has been Port Adelaide's most iconic guernsey design. The club first adopted the guernsey in the 1902 season, after having difficulty finding magenta and blue dyes that could repeatedly last the rigours of an Australian rules football match. The guernsey was designed to be a literal depiction of the wharves and pylons that were prominent along the docks of Port Adelaide at the turn of the 20th century. Prior to adopting the guernsey the club had won 3 premierships over 31 years. After adopting the guernsey, the club won 33 premierships and 3 Championships of Australia.

The nickname was used in a derogatory fashion, in an attempt to liken the club to a criminal stereotype. The nickname first appeared in media in early 1993, in a match report written by former cricketer Alan Shiell. The nickname was subsequently accepted by the Port Adelaide fanbase, becoming a popular nickname for the design among fans.

Upon joining the AFL, Port Adelaide, along with being required to find a new logo, song and nickname, was also forced to replace the Prison Bar guernsey because existing club Collingwood, already using the Magpie logo and nickname, also wore a similar guernsey with vertical black and white stripes. A new guernsey was ultimately created, incorporating teal into its design.

Since the club's entry to the AFL, Port Adelaide has made numerous requests to the AFL to wear the Prison Bar guernsey in specific games, only some of which have been approved. The club was first granted the right to wear an AFL-approved Prison Bar guernsey (a replica of the 1914 premiership design) in the Heritage Round of the 2003 season. During 2007, following controversy the year prior in which the AFL declined Port Adelaide the right to wear their heritage guernsey, the AFL and Port Adelaide reached an agreement whereby the club could wear its traditional guernsey in the heritage round, with the proviso that in future seasons its players can only wear it in home heritage round games and provided that such a game is not against Collingwood. No heritage rounds have been held since this agreement was reached. In 2014, the AFL declined Port Adelaide permission to wear its traditional guernsey for celebrating of 100 years since its 1914 Championship of Australia. On 2 September 2014, the AFL cleared the club to use the guernsey in their final against , following controversy about their prior decision to have Port Adelaide wear their clash strip. For their 150th anniversary, the club was granted permission to wear the guernsey in its Showdown match in the 2020 season. The following year, Port Adelaide requested permission to permanently wear the guernsey in all future Showdown matches, but this proposal was rejected by the AFL.

Support for the guernsey remains extremely high, with the merchandise for a single game against Carlton in 2013 generating over $500,000. On 9 September 2020, it was revealed that memorabilia associated with the Prison Bar guernsey raised $2,000,000 for the club in 2020 and the Prison Bar guernsey itself was the highest selling piece of merchandise in the AFL that year. Towards the end of 2018, a group of supporters organised to push for the return of the club's traditional guernsey full time from the start of the 2020 AFL season, to coincide with the club's 150th anniversary year, and a supporter petition in 2019 calling for the reinstatement of the guernsey reached 10,000 signatures. On 29 July 2021, club president David Koch revealed that, if the club wore the Prison Bar guernsey without permission, it would be deducted four premiership points along with a fine. The club negotiated an agreement with Collingwood to return the guernsey for the 2023 home Showdown match.

Uniform evolution

Logo evolution 

Port Adelaide has adopted different insignia on several occasions throughout its history.

Up until 2020, all of the club's insignia in the SANFL were designed around featuring one or multiple Magpies. The original club crest, adopted in 1900, featured a tan football and magpies perched on a gum tree with a black and white striped flag on the left and the Australian Red Ensign on the right. The ensign switched to blue sporadically through the 1910s before the flags were dropped in 1928. From 1930 until 2019, the logo always featured a dexter (left-facing) magpie, perched upon a gum branch (1930 to 1953) or a fence wire (1954 to 1974). The last Magpies-specific logo, used by the club between 1975 and 2019 in the SANFL, was situated inside a circular disc as was the case at all other SANFL clubs. It made mention of "Magpies" in the logo for the first time and was the longest standing in the club's history.

The club designed a new logo with a silver fist clutching a lightning bolt, in front of both a Prison Bar design and teal background, showcasing both new colours the club adopted. The logo was slightly altered in 2001 with the lightning bolt and fist defined and the reference to "Port" dropped. Ahead of the 2020 season, Port Adelaide's 150th anniversary, the club unveiled a commemorative logo to be worn by both the senior AFL team and reserves SANFL team. The logo features the "PA" acronym, 1870 to acknowledge the foundation year, the black-and-white prison bars, the chevron design of the AFL guernsey and a teal outline. Although initially intended to be used exclusively in 2020, feedback from supporters, key stakeholders and investors prompted the club to retain the logo in 2021 and beyond.

Club songs 
Over the years, Port Adelaide has used various songs and music at its games. The club has had two main official songs in the SANFL and one in the AFL, in addition to other songs representing the club unofficially. In its first season during 1870 the club invited local brass bands to play during the club's first games at Glanville. In 1882 a song based on Harry Clifton's "Work, Boys, Work (and be contented)" was written for the club as a tribute to the recently retired player Thomas Smith. Following the end of the First World War, the club adopted the song was "The Pride of Port Adelaide is my football team". The song remained in use until 1971, when Port Adelaide secretary Bob McLean decided to change the club song to "Cheer, Cheer the Black and the White" after hearing the South Melbourne Football Club's song based on the Notre Dame Fighting Irish football team's "Victory March". As Sydney was already using the Notre Dame Victory March when Port Adelaide entered the AFL, the club was forced to find a new song. "Cheer, Cheer the Black and the White" is still used by the club in the SANFL competition.

Due to the club's need for a new song upon their entry to the AFL, Port Adelaide adopted "Power to Win", written for the club by Quentin Eyers and Les Kaczmarek. The song was first played at AFL level after Port Adelaide's win against Geelong in Round 3, 1997 at Football Park. Since 2016, an alternative Pitjantjatjara language version of the song ('Nganana wanangara kanyini' – literally, 'We have the lightning bolt') has been used by the club on occasions such as Indigenous Round. As the club's official nickname was shortened to 'The Power', rather than the original 'Port Power'. the line in the song "..til the flag is ours for the taking, Port Power!" was eventually changed, removing the word 'Port' and the song was re-recorded.

Since March 2014, Port Adelaide has used "Never Tear Us Apart" by the Australian band INXS as the club's unofficial anthem leading up to the opening bounce at its new home of Adelaide Oval. The song is used as a reference to the various and unique difficulties the club faced when trying to enter the AFL, primarily in regards to the separation of its SANFL and AFL operations. Port Adelaide's use of the song stemmed from a trip the club took to Anfield in November 2012 while they were in England to play an exhibition match against the Western Bulldogs. Seeing the Anfield crowd's rendition of "You'll Never Walk Alone", Matthew Richardson, Port's general manager of marketing and consumer business, sought to replicate the pre-match experience. During a meeting in mid 2013, the idea of an anthem was raised; various songs were suggested, including "Power and the Passion" by Midnight Oil and "Power to the People" by John Schumann. "Never Tear Us Apart" by INXS was suggested by Port Adelaide's events manager, Tara MacLeod, and the song was accepted, as it resonated with the Power's history: when the Power entered the AFL in 1997, it was forced to cut ties with its traditional base, the Port Adelaide Magpies, forming separate administrations and causing division amongst supporters. Initially the song was introduced to coincide with the 60-second countdown before the start of a match, with the music playing over the top of a video montage. The song proved to be a success among the fans, with them adopting the song as well as raising scarves above their heads as the song was being sung.

Home grounds

Glanville Hall Estate/Buck's Flat (1870–1879) 

After foundation, it was decided by the inaugural president of Port Adelaide, John Hart Jr., that the club's home ground would be Glanville Hall Estate, a property owned by his immediate family. The area in which the teams played was often referred to as 'Buck's Flat'. The club was forced to cease using the ground following 1879, as the property was sold at an auction.

Alberton Oval (1880–present) 

Alberton Oval has been Port Adelaide's home ground in the SANFL since 1880, excluding 1975 and 1976. Following the end of its operations at Glanville Hall, Port Adelaide was forced to find a new ground to operate from. It was decided that the club would use Alberton Oval for the 1880 season. On 15 May 1880, Port Adelaide played its first match at Alberton Oval. The following year, the decision was made by the club to start leasing the oval from the Port Adelaide Council for the sum of 10 shillings a year. The oval is also used for training purposes for both AFL and SANFL operations, aside from 1997 through 2001 when SANFL training temporarily moved to Ethelton.

In 1975 and 1976, Port Adelaide was temporarily locked out of the ground following a dispute between the Port Adelaide Council, the SANFL and the Club over seating arrangements at the ground. The club usually split its seating revenue 50/50 with the SANFL during this time period, an arrangement the SANFL held with each club. However, the Port Adelaide Council wanted to take 50% of all game day revenue, leaving the remaining half to the two to split between themselves. In 1975, the SANFL refused to accept the offer for the ground provided by the council, resulting in the temporary suspension of Port Adelaide's lease on the ground. This prevented Port Adelaide from playing any games at the venue and, the following year, training at the venue. With the 1977 season pending, the issues between the council and the club were resolved and the club was permitted to return that year.

The ground possesses two notable grandstands named after individuals important to the club. The Fos Williams Family Stand is the oldest remaining structure at Alberton Oval, first constructed in 1903. The other grandstand, the Robert B. Quinn MM Grandstand, was first opened in 1972. The ground also has the bordering Allan Scott Power Headquarters for the administration of Port Adelaide, which opened in 1999 and is named after the club's initial major sponsor.

Football Park (1997–2013) 

Port Adelaide first played at Football Park on 15 June 1974. Despite not being officially recognised as a 'home ground' in the SANFL, it hosted night matches for every team, as well as all finals between 1974 and 2014 regardless of 'home' team. During 1975 and 1976, Port Adelaide sold some of their home games (to be played at their temporary home, Adelaide Oval) to Football Park.

Upon the club's entry to the AFL, fellow South Australian club  was already using the ground for their home matches. Port Adelaide was assigned the ground as its home venue, alongside its existing tenants. Port Adelaide's first official AFL match at the ground was on 6 April 1997, where they were defeated by Essendon by 33 points.

Planned upgrades to the stadium were cancelled following news that Port Adelaide, alongside both Adelaide and the SANFL, would make use of Adelaide Oval from 2014 onward, as it had been recently redeveloped. It hosted its final AFL match on the 31st of August that year, where Port Adelaide was defeated by a point by Carlton. The ground remains the headquarters of Adelaide, though features such as the ground's grandstands have been demolished.

Adelaide Oval (2014–present) 

Adelaide Oval has historically been used for SANFL Finals (until 1974) and the Championship of Australia match.  During the 1975 and 1976 seasons, Port Adelaide's SANFL Team was forced to play out of the ground following their dispute with the local council, using it for both match day playing and training purposes over the period. Its role as the primary venue for SANFL finals was supplanted by Football Park in 1974, following disagreements between the SANFL and South Australian Cricket Association (SACA).

Following extensive redevelopment in the early 2010s and negotiations between the SANFL and SACA over the use of the ground, the ground was cleared for football usage purposes, allowing Port Adelaide to use the ground as its home ground from the 2014 season onwards. Port Adelaide also played the first official AFL match at the venue in 2011 against Melbourne.

Adelaide Oval has two notable stands named after significant Port Adelaide individuals, the Fos Williams Stand, and the Gavin Wanganeen Stand.

Club creed 

Fos Williams authored the club's creed in 1962.

Rivalries

AFL

Adelaide

Port Adelaide has a fierce rivalry with fellow South Australian AFL team Adelaide. Matches between the two teams are known as the 'Showdown'. The rivalry between Adelaide and Port Adelaide is often considered to be among the best rivalries in the Australian Football League, with Malcolm Blight, Australian Football Hall of Fame Legend, stating in 2009 that "there is no doubt it is the greatest rivalry in football."  The Showdown rivalry also significantly draws upon the bitter, winner take all, competition for the two South Australian licences to join the AFL in the 1980s and early 1990s.

Brisbane Lions
This rivalry dates back to 1997, the inaugural season of Port Adelaide and the newly merged Brisbane Lions. In their early days, the two clubs had multiple close encounters, with a draw in two of their first three meetings. In the early 2000s, the rivalry reached its peak as the two clubs would be the most dominant of the era, meeting in multiple finals and consistently finishing at the top of the ladder from 2001 to 2004. Notable encounters include a Round 22 match in 2002 to determine the minor premiership that year, which Port Adelaide won by a single goal, and a Round 17 match in 2003 with 7 lead changes in the final quarter, which Port Adelaide won by a point. The rivalry culminated with the 2004 AFL Grand Final, where Port Adelaide defeated Brisbane to win their first premiership, and end Brisbane's chance to win a fourth consecutive. The rivalry has since died down.

SANFL

Norwood

The rivalry between Port Adelaide and the Norwood Football Club is one of the longest standing rivalries in South Australian league football. The two clubs met for the first time in 1878, where Port Adelaide hosted Norwood, with the visitors winning 1–0. However, the rivalry between the two clubs would first begin in 1882, where Port Adelaide's first win over Norwood was controversially overruled by the league, with a follow-up game overshadowed by a misunderstanding at the gate which almost prevented Norwood players accessing the venue.

The clubs met in 14 Grand Finals prior to Port Adelaide's accession into the AFL and share over 60 premierships between them. In 1884, Port Adelaide won the premiership, bringing Norwood's run of six premierships in a row to an end. In 1960, Norwood brought Port Adelaide's own record run of six premierships to an end defeating them by 27 points in the 1960 Preliminary Final. They have met in three Grand Finals following Port Adelaide's entry to the AFL, with Port Adelaide winning in 1999 and Norwood winning in 1997 and 2014. The two clubs are the only clubs in any of the elite Australian Rules Football leagues (the SANFL, WAFL, and VFL/AFL) to win six successive premierships.

Playing lists

Corporate

Administrative positions 

 Chairman: David Koch
 Chief executive: Matthew Richardson
 Football operations: Chris Davies
 Board members:
 Kevin Osborn (deputy chairman)
 Cos Cardone
 Darren Cahill
 Holly Ransom
 Jamie Restas
 Andrew Day
 Kathy Nagle
 Christine Zeitz
 Rob Snowdon

Sponsors 

 Current major sponsors 
 GFG Alliance
KFC
 MG Motor

 Key China game sponsors 

 Shanghai Cred

 Apparel sponsors 
 Nike (1997–2006)
 Reebok (2007–2012)
ISC (2013–2020)
 Macron (2021–present)

Supporters 

The Port Adelaide Football Club has historically drawn its supporter base in the region of Port Adelaide. Since the club's entry to the AFL, support for the club had increased within suburbs of Adelaide – notably, the northern suburbs. It has also experienced growth in regional South Australia.

Port Adelaide has many supporter groups from all around Australia, with every state and territory except Tasmania having an officially recognised supporter group. Among these, the Port Adelaide Cheer Squad, the official supporter group from Adelaide, creates banners to be used by the club and has official seating to cheer at home games. There are also a number of unofficial supporter groups who perform activities for the club and its fans, such as the Outer Army and the Alberton Crowd.

Number-one ticket holders 
David Koch – Seven Network's Sunrise co-host, current club chairman
Stuart O'Grady – Australian professional road bicycle racer
Teresa Palmer – Australian model and actress
Bob Quinn – former Port Adelaide player
Tony Santic – owner of racehorse Makybe Diva

Membership and attendance

Partnerships

Indigenous community 

The Port Adelaide Football Club has a long-standing connection to the indigenous community. Initial club president John Hart Jr., alongside his father, were the founders of The Adelaide Milling and Mercantile Company in Port Adelaide, which employed Kaurna people alongside non-indigenous workers as early as the 1850s. John Hart Sr. advocated for other settlers to refrain from killing and eating black swans as they were a totem of the Kaurna people. Harry Hewitt was named in Port Adelaide's side when they defeated Fitzroy by two goals on Adelaide Oval in 1891 and is the club's first known Indigenous Australian player. During the 1950s, St Francis House in Glanville housed young indigenous boys, many of whom played for Port Adelaide. Richie Bray became the club's first known Indigenous player to win a premiership, featuring in the 1962, 1963 and 1965 premierships winning teams.

Port Adelaide has been represented by 62 indigenous players across the SANFL and AFL competitions throughout its history. Upon the club's entry to the AFL in 1997, the club appointed its first Indigenous captain in Gavin Wanganeen. Wanganeen would later become the first indigenous player in the AFL to play 300 games, and the first indigenous player to join the board of an AFL club.

In 2008, the club started the Aboriginal Power Cup to help promote academic and healthy outcomes for indigenous students in South Australia.

China partnership 

On 14 April 2016, Port Adelaide announced it had struck a three-year multimillion-dollar partnership with leading Chinese property developer Shanghai Cred, where Port Adelaide would take primary responsibility for developing Australian rules football in China. This involved the club holding annual training camps and providing sponsorship in China, as well as producing AFL programs and broadcasting games in the country via China Central Television and other networks.  The same day, it was revealed by then Prime Minister Malcolm Turnbull that Port Adelaide had an intention to play an in-season AFL match in China. As part of the partnership, Port Adelaide also agreed to annually run an Australian rules football program in over 20 Chinese schools, culminating in a football carnival the same week the AFL premiership match is held in Shanghai.

The first AFL game played for premiership points was played in May 2017 between the Gold Coast Suns and Port Adelaide. In October 2018, the AFL announced St Kilda would be taking over from the Gold Coast Suns in the China fixture, with Gold Coast citing guernsey disagreements as a reason for exiting the deal. In 2019, 4.01 million people watched the match between Port Adelaide and St Kilda. Due to the COVID-19 pandemic, the match was not played in the 2020 or 2021 AFL seasons.

Club honour boards

Honour Board 

In the Port Adelaide clubrooms at Alberton Oval there is a large wooden honour board with gold text that details every season of the club from 1870 to the present.

SANFL Honour Board (Post AFL Entry)

Hall of Fame 
Port Adelaide launched the club Hall of Fame on 20 February 1998, when it inducted inaugural 18 members into the Hall of Fame. It has since honoured 40 more players, coaches, administrators and club servants who have played a major part in the club, in addition to two eras of premiership teams.

Greatest Team 
In June 2001, the Port Adelaide Football Club announced its 'Greatest Team' from the prior two centuries, consisting of the most successful players from the club. Between the 22 players inducted, they shared 201 premiership medals, 532 state games, 16 Magarey Medals and numerous other football accolades. The club hailed the group the "Greatest Team of the Greatest Club".

Military service

Club achievements 
Port Adelaide is one of the most successful clubs in senior level football, having won a record 37 senior premierships across the AFL and SANFL competitions. The club won its first premiership in 1884, while its most recent senior level premiership was in 2004. The club has won a record 4 Championship of Australia titles, and have won the Stanley H. Lewis trophy 12 times, second to only Norwood (14). Port Adelaide has had two notable periods of success under the leadership of Fos Williams, who coached 9 premierships, and John Cahill, who coached 10.

Player achievements

Competition awards 
Brownlow Medal (AFL fairest and best)
 2021 – Ollie Wines

Magarey Medal (SANFL best and fairest)

 1899 – Stan Malin
 1907 – Jack Mack
 1910 – Sampson Hosking
 1914 – Jack Ashley
 1915 – Sampson Hosking
 1921 – Charlie Adams
 1925 – Peter Bampton
 1938 – Bob Quinn
 1945 – Bob Quinn
 1956 – Dave Boyd
 1964 – Geof Motley
 1967 – Trevor Obst
 1971 – Russell Ebert
 1974 – Russell Ebert
 1975 – Peter Woite
 1976 – Russell Ebert
 1980 – Russell Ebert
 1986 – Greg Anderson
 1990 – Scott Hodges
 1992 – Nathan Buckley
 2001 – Tony Brown and Ryan O'Connor
 2003 – Brett Ebert
 2005 – Jeremy Clayton
 2013 - Matt Thomas

AFLCA Champion Player of the Year
 2004 – Warren Tredrea
 2014 – Robbie Gray
AFL Rising Star (Best player under 21)
 1997 – Michael Wilson
 2006 – Danyle Pearce

Grand final best on ground awards 
Norm Smith Medal (AFL Grand Final best on ground)
 2004 – Byron Pickett
Jack Oatey Medal (SANFL Grand Final best on ground)
 1981 – Russell Ebert
 1988 – Bruce Abernethy
 1989 – Russell Johnston
 1990 – George Fiacchi
 1992 – Nathan Buckley
 1994 – Darryl Wakelin
 1995 – Anthony Darcy
 1996 – David Brown
 1998 – Brett Chalmers
 1999 – Darryl Poole

Club awards 
John Cahill Medal (best and fairest)

Allan Robert McLean Medal (SANFL best and fairest)
Allan Robert McLean Medal

Gavin Wanganeen Medal (Best player under 21)

 2006 – Danyle Pearce
 2007 – Justin Westhoff
 2008 – Alipate Carlile
 2009 – Travis Boak
 2010 – Jackson Trengove
 2011 – Hamish Hartlett
 2012 – Chad Wingard
 2013 – Ollie Wines
 2014 – Ollie Wines
 2015 – Ollie Wines
 2016 – Jarman Impey
 2017 – Sam Powell-Pepper
 2018 – Dan Houston
 2019 – Connor Rozee
 2020 – Zak Butters
 2021 – Mitch Georgiades

Fos Williams Medal (Best Team Man)

 1997 – Brayden Lyle
 1998 – Brayden Lyle
 1999 – Josh Francou
 2000 – Matthew Primus
 2001 – Matthew Primus
 2002 – Josh Carr
 2003 – Josh Carr
 2004 – Michael Wilson
 2005 – Darryl Wakelin
 2006 – Brendon Lade
 2007 – Troy Chaplin
 2008 – Domenic Cassisi
 2009 – Domenic Cassisi
 2010 – Domenic Cassisi
 2011 – Domenic Cassisi
 2012 – Brad Ebert
 2013 – Travis Boak
 2014 – Travis Boak
 2015 – Travis Boak
 2016 – Jasper Pittard
 2017 – Tom Jonas
 2018 – Tom Jonas
 2019 – Travis Boak
 2020 – Travis Boak
 2021 – Travis Boak

Coaches' Award (Most Improved Player) 

 1998 – Warren Tredrea
 1999 – Warren Tredrea
 2000 – Roger James
 2001 – Josh Carr
 2002 – Chad Cornes
 2003 – Dean Brogan
 2004 – Kane Cornes
 2005 – Domenic Cassisi
 2006 – Shaun Burgoyne
 2007 – David Rodan
 2008 – Travis Boak
 2009 – Robbie Gray
 2010 – Paul Stewart
 2011 – Tom Logan
 2012 – Tom Jonas
 2013 – Justin Westhoff
 2014 – Matthew Lobbe
 2015 – Brendon Ah Chee
 2016 – Jasper Pittard
 2017 – Sam Gray
 2018 – Dan Houston
 2019 – Darcy Byrne-Jones
 2020 – Trent McKenzie
 2021 – Karl Amon

John McCarthy Medal (Community Award)

 2013 – Jack Hombsch
 2014 – Brad Ebert
 2015 – Nathan Krakouer
 2016 – Jack Hombsch
 2017 – Jack Hombsch
 2018 – Justin Westhoff
 2019 – Travis Boak
 2020 – Justin Westhoff
 2021 – Travis Boak

All-Australian 
An All-Australian team is considered a 'best-of' selection of players for each calendar year, with each player represented in their team position. Each team is selected by a panel of experts.

Sporting Life's All Australian 
 
Sporting Life Magazine first pioneered the concept of an All-Australian 'team of the year' in 1947, and would run each year until 1955. The AFL does not recognise the teams selected by Sporting Life.
 Bob Quinn – 1947 (captain)
 Dick Russell – 1950
 Fos Williams – 1950, 1951
 Harold McDonald – 1951, 1955

Official 
All Australian teams from the Interstate Carnivals and Australian Football League have been endorsed as official by governing bodies of the sport, such as the Australian National Football Council and the AFL.

Interstate carnivals

 John Abley – 1956, 1958, 1961
 John Cahill – 1969
 Greg Phillips – 1980
 Mark Williams – 1980
 Craig Bradley – 1983, 1985
 Tony Giles – 1983
 Stephen Curtis – 1983
 Greg Anderson – 1987
 Martin Leslie – 1988

Australian Football League

 Adam Heuskes – 1997
 Gavin Wanganeen – 2001, 2003
 Matthew Primus – 2001, 2002
 Warren Tredrea – 2001, 2002, 2003, 2004
 Brett Montgomery – 2002
 Josh Francou – 2002
 Chad Cornes – 2004, 2007
 Mark Williams – 2004 (coach)
 Kane Cornes – 2005, 2007
 Brendon Lade – 2006, 2007
 Shaun Burgoyne – 2006
 Chad Wingard – 2013, 2015
 Travis Boak – 2013, 2014, 2020 (VC)
 Robbie Gray – 2014, 2015, 2017, 2018
 Paddy Ryder – 2017
 Darcy Byrne-Jones – 2020
 Charlie Dixon – 2020
 Aliir Aliir — 2021
 Ollie Wines – 2021
 Connor Rozee – 2022

Records

Notes

References

External links 

 

 
Australian Football League clubs
Australian rules football clubs established in 1870
Sporting clubs in Adelaide
Australian rules football clubs in South Australia
1870 establishments in Australia